Irfandy Zein Al Zubeidy  (born 29 August 1995) is an Indonesian footballer who currently plays for PS TIRA in the Liga 1 as a midfielder.

Career
Irfandy has joined in the Bali United F.C. For 2015 Jenderal Sudirman Cup. Finally, Irfandy moved from Bali United and joined PS TNI at the Indonesia Soccer Championship event.

PS TNI
Irfandy made his debut against Bhayangkara F.C. in the second week of ISC. And Irfandy made his first goal in a match against Mitra Kukar F.C. in 8th minutes.

References

External links
 

1995 births
Living people
Indonesian footballers
Association football midfielders
Liga 1 (Indonesia) players
Persija Jakarta players
People from Tulehu
Sportspeople from Maluku (province)